The meridian 176° west of Greenwich is a line of longitude that extends from the North Pole across the Arctic Ocean, Asia, the Pacific Ocean, the Southern Ocean, and Antarctica to the South Pole.

The 176th meridian west forms a great circle with the 4th meridian east.

From Pole to Pole
Starting at the North Pole and heading south to the South Pole, the 176th meridian west passes through:

{| class="wikitable plainrowheaders"
! scope="col" width="130" | Co-ordinates
! scope="col" width="120" | Country, territory or sea
! scope="col" | Notes
|-
| style="background:#b0e0e6;" | 
! scope="row" style="background:#b0e0e6;" | Arctic Ocean
| style="background:#b0e0e6;" |
|-valign="top"
| style="background:#b0e0e6;" | 
! scope="row" style="background:#b0e0e6;" | Chukchi Sea
| style="background:#b0e0e6;" | Passing just west of Herald Island, Chukotka Autonomous Okrug,  (at )
|-
| 
! scope="row" | 
| Chukotka Autonomous Okrug — Chukchi Peninsula
|-
| style="background:#b0e0e6;" | 
! scope="row" style="background:#b0e0e6;" | Bering Sea
| style="background:#b0e0e6;" |
|-valign="top"
| 
! scope="row" | 
| Alaska — Great Sitkin Island, Umak Island and Little Tanaga Island
|-valign="top"
| style="background:#b0e0e6;" | 
! scope="row" style="background:#b0e0e6;" | Pacific Ocean
| style="background:#b0e0e6;" | Passing just east of Wallis Island,  (at ) Passing just west of Niuafo'ou Island,  (at ) Passing just east of 'Ata Island,  (at ) Passing just east of Chatham Island,  (at )
|-
| 
! scope="row" | 
| Star Keys/Motuhope islands
|-
| style="background:#b0e0e6;" | 
! scope="row" style="background:#b0e0e6;" | Pacific Ocean
| style="background:#b0e0e6;" | Passing just east of Pitt Island,  (at )
|-
| style="background:#b0e0e6;" | 
! scope="row" style="background:#b0e0e6;" | Southern Ocean
| style="background:#b0e0e6;" |
|-
| 
! scope="row" | Antarctica
| Ross Dependency, claimed by 
|-
|}

See also
175th meridian west
177th meridian west

w176 meridian west